The United Nations Office in Burundi (BNUB) was established by the United Nations Security Council in December 2010 as a scaled-down operation to replace the United Nations Integrated Office in Burundi from 1 January 2011.

BNUB, established by Resolution 1959 (2010), was authorised to:

The Security Council gave BNUB an initial twelve month mandate until the end of December 2011, which was extended until February 15, 2013.

The BNUB completed its mandate 31 December 2014, and its responsibilities were transferred to the UN Development Assistance Framework - specifically to the Country Team for Burundi. The UN Electoral Observation Mission in Burundi (MENUB) officially began work on 1 January 2015.

See also
 Burundi Civil War

References

External links
 https://menub.unmissions.org/en

Politics of Burundi
1959
Burundi and the United Nations